Charles Henry Selick Jr. (born November 30, 1952) is an American film director, producer, screenwriter, production designer, and animator who is best known for directing the stop-motion animation films The Nightmare Before Christmas (1993), James and the Giant Peach (1996), Monkeybone (2001), Coraline (2009), and Wendell & Wild (2022). He studied at the Program in Experimental Animation at California Institute of the Arts, under the guidance of Jules Engel. Selick is also known for his collaborations with voice actor and artist Joe Ranft.

Early life
Selick was born in Glen Ridge, New Jersey, the son of Melanie (née Molan) and Charles H. Selick. He was raised in Rumson. Selick did little but draw from ages 3 to 12. His fascination with animation came at a young age, when he saw Lotte Reiniger's stop-motion film The Adventures of Prince Achmed and the animated creatures of The 7th Voyage of Sinbad by Ray Harryhausen. He graduated from Rumson-Fair Haven High School in 1970.

After studying science at Rutgers University in New Brunswick and art at Syracuse University and Central Saint Martins College of Art and Design in London, Selick eventually enrolled at the California Institute of the Arts (CalArts) to study animation. His two student films there, Phases and Tube Tales, were nominated for Student Academy Awards.

Film work

Disney
After his academic studies, he went to work for Walt Disney Studios as an "in-betweener" and animator trainee on such films as Pete's Dragon and The Small One. He became a full-fledged animator under Glen Keane on The Fox and the Hound. During his time at Disney, he met and worked around the likes of Rick Heinrichs, Jorgen Klubien, Brad Bird, John Musker, Dan Haskett, Sue and Bill Kroyer, Ed Gombert, Andy Gaskill and Tim Burton. Burton served as producer on Selick's first two films as director, the Disney-produced The Nightmare Before Christmas and James and the Giant Peach. Years later, Selick claimed he learned a lot to improve his drawing, animation, and storytelling skills from Disney legend Eric Larson.

Further work
Selick's third feature was Monkeybone, a live-action/stop-motion adaptation of an underground comic by 20th Century Fox. The film was a flop both commercially and critically. Selick, who animated the fictional sea creatures in Wes Anderson's The Life Aquatic with Steve Zissou, signed on as animation director on Anderson's Fantastic Mr. Fox. In February 2006, Selick left the project, to work on Coraline for Laika. Selick, who kept in contact with Anderson, said the director would act out scenes in Fantastic Mr. Fox while in Paris and send them to the animators via iPhone.

Coraline (2009) 
Selick's first feature with Laika was Coraline, based on the novel Coraline by acclaimed author Neil Gaiman, and released in 2009. It was the first stereoscopic stop-motion animated film. The film received generally positive reviews from critics. Coraline was nominated for an Academy Award, a BAFTA, and a Golden Globe, all for Best Animated Feature.

Work with Pixar
Selick left Laika in 2009. In 2010, Selick joined with Pixar and The Walt Disney Company in a long-term contract to exclusively produce stop-motion films. This not only returned Selick to his original roots, but also reunited Selick with numerous former friends and co-animators. His new studio, called Cinderbiter Productions, was self-described as "a new stop motion company whose mandate is to make great, scary films for young 'uns with a small, tight-knit crew who watch each other's backs."

Selick and Cinderbiter's first film under this deal, a project called ShadeMaker, was set to be released on October 4, 2013. In 2011, the film was green-lit for production and retitled The Shadow King. In August 2012, it was reported that, after spending a reported $50 million, Walt Disney Pictures canceled the project, due to "a creative and scheduling standpoint, the pic wasn't where it needed to be to meet its planned release date." Selick now had the option to shop the project to another studio. Selick later revealed in interviews that the film suffered from interference from the then CCO of Pixar John Lasseter, who Selick claimed came in and constantly changed elements of the script and production that ended up ballooning the budget. In a 2022 interview, Selick said that he had reacquired the rights for The Shadow King from Disney and that he may revive the project.

On April 28, 2012, it was announced that Disney had optioned the rights for Neil Gaiman's novel The Graveyard Book. Later that same day, it was announced that Selick would direct the film after work was completed on ShadeMaker. It was unknown if the adaptation would be live-action or stop motion.  After the studio and Selick parted ways over scheduling and development, it was announced in January 2013 that Ron Howard would direct the film.

In February 2013, it was reported in a press release by Selick that K5 International would be handling sales for The Shadow King at the European Film Market. It was unknown when the film would actually be released. In August 2016, a rep for Selick said the film was "in turnaround again" while Selick continued work on his other two projects: A Tale Dark and Grimm and Wendell and Wild.

On October 16, 2013, Selick announced a live-action film adaptation of Adam Gidwitz's children's novel A Tale Dark and Grimm.

Wendell & Wild (2022)
On November 3, 2015, it was reported that Selick was developing Wendell & Wild, a new stop-motion feature with Jordan Peele and Keegan-Michael Key based on an original story by Selick. In 2018, the film was picked up by Netflix. The film was released on October 28, 2022, on Netflix.

Upcoming projects
In June 2017, Selick was reported to direct the pilot and subsequent episodes of a Little Nightmares TV adaptation produced by the Russo brothers.

Filmography

Short films

Feature films

Animator 
 The Small One (1978)
 Animalympics (1980) (uncredited)
 The Fox and the Hound (1981) (uncredited)
 Winnie the Pooh and a Day for Eeyore (1983) (uncredited)
 Mickey's Christmas Carol (1983) (uncredited)
 The Black Cauldron (1985) (uncredited)
 The Great Mouse Detective (1986) (uncredited)

Others 
 Pete's Dragon (1977) (inbetweener)
 The Watcher in the Woods (1980) (designer of the alien)
 Tron (1982) (uncredited storyboard artist)
 Twice Upon a Time (1983) (sequence director)
 Return to Oz (1985) (storyboard artist)
 Nutcracker: The Motion Picture (1986) (visual adaptation)
 The Brave Little Toaster (1987) (uncredited storyboard artist)
 MTV ID's: "Gravity", "Masks '87", "Dollhouse M", "Bath for Dad", "Haircut M", "Xerox Bug" (1987–1990)
 Who Framed Roger Rabbit (1988) (inbetweener)
 The Life Aquatic with Steve Zissou (2004) (visual effects)

Preservation
In 2012, the Academy Film Archive preserved several of Selick's short films: Phases, Seepage, and Tube Tales.

References

External links 

 

1952 births
Animators from New Jersey
American animated film directors
American animated film producers
Animation screenwriters
Film directors from New Jersey
Living people
People from Glen Ridge, New Jersey
People from Rumson, New Jersey
Rumson-Fair Haven Regional High School alumni
Stop motion animators
California Institute of the Arts alumni
CAS Filmmaker Award honorees
Walt Disney Animation Studios people
American storyboard artists